Wooster may refer to:

Places

India 
 Wooster Nagar, a small fishing village in the state of Tamil Nadu

United States 
 Wooster, Arkansas, a town in Faulkner County
 Wooster, Georgia, an unincorporated community
 Wooster, Kosciusko County, Indiana, an unincorporated community
 Wooster, Scott County, Indiana, an unincorporated community
 Wooster, Ohio, a city in Wayne County
 Wooster, Baytown, Texas
 Wooster Square, a neighborhood in the city of New Haven, Connecticut
 Wooster Township, Wayne County, Ohio

Schools in the United States 
 College of Wooster, in Wooster, Ohio
 Earl Wooster High School, in Reno, Nevada
 Wooster High School (Ohio), in Wooster, Ohio
 Wooster School, in Danbury, Connecticut

Groups and organizations 
 Wooster Collective, an online street art website
 The Wooster Group, a New York-based U.S. ensemble of theatre and media artists
 Wooster Warriors, a former U.S. ice hockey team

Other uses
 Wooster Island, an island in the Housatonic River in Orange, Connecticut
 Wooster Lake, a lake in Lake County, Illinois

People with the surname Wooster 
 Charles Whiting Wooster, 1780-1848, grandson of David Wooster and Commander-in-Chief of the Chilean Navy 
 David Wooster (1710–1777), brigadier-general in the Continental Army during the American Revolution
 Edward Wooster (1622–1689), early pioneer and founder of Derby, Connecticut
 Fred Wooster (1938–1993), cofounder of the Saanich Lacrosse Association, Canadian Lacrosse Hall of Fame
 Louise Wooster (1842–1913), "Lou Wooster", famous madam in Birmingham, Alabama
 Reginald Wooster (1903-1968), English cricketer who made one first-class appearance for Northamptonshire
 Stanton Hall Wooster of Wooster and Davis, a U.S. Navy airman who attempted to fly over the Atlantic Ocean in 1927

Fictional characters 
 Bertie Wooster, character in the stories of P. G. Wodehouse, adapted in the Jeeves and Wooster TV show
 Henry Wooster, character in the stories of P. G. Wodehouse, uncle of Bertie Wooster

See also 
 Wooster Street (disambiguation)
 Worcester (disambiguation), pronounced and commonly misspelled Wooster